Wolf Albach-Retty (born Wolfgang Helmuth Albert Albach; 28 May 1906 – 21 February 1967) was an Austrian actor. He was the father of Romy Schneider with the German actress Magda Schneider.

Career
Born as Wolfgang Helmuth Albert Albach in Vienna to actress Rosa Albach-Retty and K. u. K. officer Karl Albach, Albach-Retty trained at the University of Music and Performing Arts, Vienna, and at the age of twenty played his first role at the Vienna Burgtheater. 

He was a young man when he first appeared in a silent film role in 1927. In 1933 Albach-Retty became a patron member of the SS and in 1940 he joined the Nazi Party.

During the Third Reich, he made romance films and musicals. In 1936 he married Magda Schneider and temporarily took up German citizenship. In 1944, he was added to head of Reich Ministry of Public Enlightenment and Propaganda Joseph Goebbels' Gottbegnadeten list of individuals that Goebbels considered crucial to Nazi culture. His addition to the list made him exempt from military service obligations.

After World War II, his acting career soured as his past successes were no longer remembered and he was only able to find supporting acting roles in films. He returned to the Burgtheater and starred in, among other plays, Anatol by Arthur Schnitzler. By that time he was into his second marriage to actress Trude Marlen, they had a daughter Sacha Darwin (* 1947) together. 
He died in Vienna and is buried in Vienna's Zentralfriedhof.

Selected filmography

1927: Das grobe Hemd
1928: Ein Wiener Musikantenmädel
1928: The Mysterious Mirror - Bildhauer
1928: Love in May
1929: Der Dieb im Schlafcoupée
1930: The Uncle from Sumatra
1930: General Babka
1930: Der Fleck auf der Ehr - Fred, ihr Enkel
1931: Wiener Zauberklänge - Teddy Beamgarden
1932: Two Hearts Beat as One - Victor Müller
1932: Girls to Marry - Paul, sein Bruder
1932: The Beautiful Adventure - Andre d'Eguzon
1932: The Black Hussar - Leutnant Aribert von Blome
1933: And the Plains Are Gleaming - Peter Borly, Husarenleutnant
1933: Kind, ich freu' mich auf dein Kommen - Herbert
1933: Love Must Be Understood - Bobby Brandt, Ellens Vetter
1934: Just Once a Great Lady - Heinz von Wolfenstein
1934: Spring Parade - Wilhelm August Jurek
1934: Tales from the Vienna Woods - Graf Rudi von Waldheim
1935: Die Katz' im Sack - Edmund Vernon, Rennfahrer
1935: Winter Night's Dream - Peter Kreutzberg
1935: Großreinemachen - Robert Cox
1935: The Bird Seller - Adam der Vogelhändler
1935: Sylvia und ihr Chauffeur - Dr. Hartenegg
1936: Rendezvous in Wien - Franz Lenhardt - Musiker
1936: Die Puppenfee - Alexander - sein Bruder
1936: Geheimnis eines alten Hauses - Teddy Eberlein
1937: Millionäre/Ich möcht' so gern mit Dir allein sein - Fred, beider Sohn
1937: Die glücklichste Ehe der Welt - Peter Reiterer
1937: Darling of the Sailors - Kapitänleutnant Igor Juritsch
1938: Frühlingsluft - Erbprinz, Rudolf
1938: Der Hampelmann - Paul Oertel
1939: Hotel Sacher - Lt. Herrngruber
1939: Liebe streng verboten
1939: Heimatland - Günther Nordmann, Reitlehrer
1939: A Mother's Love - Walter Pirlinger - 1922
1939: Das Glück wohnt nebenan
1940: Wie konntest Du, Veronika - Dr. Fred Junker
1940: Falstaff in Vienna - Robert von Weitenegg
1940: Seven Years Hard Luck - Heinz Kersten
1941: So gefällst Du mir - Peter Seidl
1941: Tanz mit dem Kaiser - Rittmeister von Kleber
1942: Die heimliche Gräfin - Michael Hohenwardt
1942: Seven Years of Good Luck/Seven Years of Happiness - Heinz Kersten 
1943: Two Happy People
1943: Mask in Blue - Georg Harding
1943: Abenteuer im Grand Hotel - Rudolf, Count Lerchenau / Rudi Lindt
1943: The White Dream - Ernst Eder
1943: Reisebekanntschaft - Walter Falke
1943: Alles aus Liebe - Rolf Möller, Tierdresseur
1944: Romantische Brautfahrt - Der junge Baron Ferdinand Crisander
1944: Hundstage - Dr. Paul Wendler
1945: A Man Like Maximilian - Dr. Thomas Hesse
1945: Wie ein Dieb in der Nacht
1948: Alles Lüge - Will Wolters
1949: Ein bezaubernder Schwindler - Martin Palmer, junger Komponist
1949: Dangerous Guests - Peter Anders
1950: Grossstadtnacht - Alfred Siedler
1950: Two in One Suit - Otto Vogel
1950: The Man in Search of Himself - Marius Aldon
1951: Czardas der Herzen - Peter Tornay / Paul Endre
1951:  - Dr. Gött
1951: Unschuld in tausend Nöten/Das Mädel aus der Konfektion - Dr. Singer
1951:  - Sandor von Halvany
1951:  - Georg Schmittlein
1952: Der Mann in der Wanne1952: Ideal Woman Sought - Robby Holm
1952: The Mine Foreman - Andreas Spaun, ein Kavalier
1953: The Bird Seller - Fürst
1954: The Great Lola - Carlo Werner
1954: The Sweetest Fruits - Roberto di Caramello / Bananen-Beppo
1954: School for Marriage - Tobias
1954: The Seven Dresses of Katrin - Martin Pall
1955: His Daughter is Called Peter - Ingenieur Max Klaar, ihr Vater
1955: Your Life Guards - Onkel Nikolaus
1956: Ein Herz und eine Seele/...und wer küsst mich? - Lindner
1956:  - Enrico Alovanis
1956: Engagement at Wolfgangsee - Erich Eckberg
1956: Imperial and Royal Field Marshal - Baron Linsky
1957:  - Kapitän Paul Heider
1957:  - Baron Siebenzell
1957:  - Erzherzog Max
1958: Endangered Girls - Dr. Thomas Jensen
1958: Man ist nur zweimal jung - Peter Grafenegger
1958: Immer die Radfahrer - Prof. Johannes Büttner
1958: Mein ganzes Herz ist voll Musik - Niko Berthold
1959:  - Albert Türkheim
1959: Peter, das Zirkuskind/Auf allen Strassen - Christian, Gutsbesitzer
1959: Girls for the Mambo-Bar - Krüger
1959: Hunting Party - Friedrich Dahlhoff
1960: Frauen in Teufels Hand - Herr von Parisi
1960:  - Mr. Reichert
1961:  - Baron von Danning
1961: Autofahrer unterwegs/Auf den Strassen einer Stadt - Peters
1962: The Post Has Gone - Lukas Lenz
1962: The Forester's Daughter - Graf Paalen
1963: Bergwind - Herr Meister
1964:  - Chef der Wiener Eisrevue
1964: The Cardinal1964: Die Kinder (TV Movie) - Gandolf Graf Freyn
1964: Das Mädel aus dem Böhmerwald - Herr Baumann
1965: Leinen aus Irland (TV Movie) - Ministerialrat Kress
1966: Die Tänzerin Fanny Elssler (TV Movie) - Fürst Esterházy (final film role)

References

Further reading
Oliver Rathkolb: Führertreu und gottbegnadet: Künstlereliten im Dritten Reich. Österreichischer Bundesverlag, Wien, 1991, pp. 235–236 (* footnote 674, p. 285, source: AdR, Bundesministerium für Unterricht, Kunst und Kultur. Karton 12. Sammelakten 1946. ZI. 12 B.K./46).
 Ernst Klee: Das Kulturlexikon zum Dritten Reich: Wer war was vor und nach 1945''. S. Fischer, Frankfurt am Main, 2007, p. 12.

External links

Photos of Wolf Albach-Retty

1906 births
1967 deaths
Male actors from Vienna
Austrian male film actors
Austrian male silent film actors
Förderndes Mitglied der SS
University of Music and Performing Arts Vienna alumni
Burials at the Vienna Central Cemetery
20th-century Austrian male actors
Nazi Party members